Fred Viktor Persson (born 22 August 1973) is a Swedish former professional footballer who played as a midfielder. He made 54 Allsvenskan appearances for Djurgårdens IF and scored three goals.

References

1973 births
Living people
Association football midfielders
Swedish footballers
Sweden youth international footballers
Allsvenskan players
Djurgårdens IF Fotboll players